Gennings Park (sometimes spelt Jennings, and referred to as Gennings House or Gennings Court), located on Lughorse Lane near Hunton, Kent, is a Grade II listed house which was built between 1727 and 1745. The home was listed on 5 December 1984 (English Heritage Legacy ID: 432086). The document indicates that the house "possibly incorporating part of a late C16 or C17 house" was extensively modified in the subsequent years, and was "thought to be the setting for 'Pride and Prejudice'. (Mr. Mattingley, unpublished work on Gennings)". That assumption is not supported by other sources, however.

Occupants
In the mid to late 18th century, the house was purchased by Sir Walter Roberts, 6th Bt. His only child, Jane Roberts, inherited the house upon his death. Jane Roberts married George Beauclerk, 3rd Duke of St Albans (a great-grandson of Charles II of England). The 3rd Duke and Duchess of St Albans had no children, and the Duchess died in 1778.

In 1871 the Liberal politician Henry Campbell-Bannerman inherited the estate from his uncle, Henry Bannerman, and the Campbell-Bannermans kept the house as their country residence until 1887. (In fact, Campbell-Bannerman inherited the entire estate of Hunton Court Lodge but did not occupy the mansion until the 1894 death of the aunt who was living there. He and his wife used Gennings Park during some of that time.)

Upon his death, his nephew James Campbell-Bannerman inherited the estate in 1908.

Following the Campbell-Bannermans' departure in 1887, the house was lived in by John Bazley White, who lived in the house until at least 1893. In 1895 the occupants of the house were Conservative MP and distiller Sir Frederick Seager Hunt, 1st Bt and his wife.

The house was purchased in 1909 by Ellen Stager, wife of Arthur Butler, 4th Marquess of Ormonde, who at the time were known as Lord and Lady Arthur Butler. Lord Arthur was the younger brother and heir to James Butler, 3rd Marquess of Ormonde and Lady Arthur, daughter of General Anson Stager, was an American heiress who had an inheritance of $1,000,000.  They continued to live at Gennings after Lord Arthur inherited the title Marquess of Ormonde. Lord Ormonde died in 1943, and Lady Ormonde lived at Gennings with her son, Lord Arthur (who would later become Arthur Butler, 6th Marquess of Ormonde in 1949), his wife Jesse and their daughter, Lady Martha, until her death in 1951.

In 1955 their second son, Arthur Butler, 6th Marquess of Ormonde, sold Gennings and much of its contents. The house was reported as sold by Country Life on 28 April 1955, and described as 'a house with 20 bedrooms, a period farm-house and model farm, 16 cottages and 173 acres,'.

References 

1745 establishments in England
Houses completed in 1745
Grade II listed buildings in Kent
Grade II listed houses
Henry Campbell-Bannerman
Prime ministerial homes in the United Kingdom